Sofia Vembo (10 February 1910, in Gallipoli, East Thrace, Turkey – 10 March 1978, in Athens, Greece) was a leading Greek singer and actress active from the interwar period to the early postwar years and the 1950s. She became best known for her performance of patriotic songs during the Greco-Italian War, when she was dubbed the "Songstress of Victory".

Biography
Vembo's real name was Efi Bembou (Έφη Μπέμποu). She was born in Gallipoli (i.e. "beautiful city"), Eastern Thrace - Turkey, in 1910, but after the Asia Minor Catastrophe, her family moved to Tsaritsani of Larissa in Greece, where her father became a tobacco worker, and later to Volos in Greece.

She began her career in Thessaloniki in the early 1930s. In the winter of 1933, she was hired by the theater operator Fotis Samartzis of the  Kentrikon theater for the revue "Parrot 1933". She then began to record romantic songs for the Columbia company, achieving fame because of her distinctly sonorous contralto voice.

Her reputation, however, skyrocketed after the Italian attack on Greece on 28 October 1940, when her performance of patriotic and satirical songs became a major inspiration for the fighting soldiers as well as the people at large for whom she quickly became a folk heroine. At the same time, she offered 2,000 gold pounds from her own fortune to the Hellenic Navy. Following the German invasion and occupation of the country in April 1941, she was transported to the Middle East, where she continued to perform for the Greek troops in exile.

After the war, in 1949, she acquired her own theatre, the "Vembo Theatre", in the Metaxourgeio neighborhood of Athens. In 1957, she married her long-time lover Mimis Traiforos. During the 1960s, she began to perform less and less, before finally retiring in the early 1970s. She died on 11 March 1978.

Because of her role in the war and her efforts during the Axis occupation, she was awarded the rank of Major in the Greek Army.

Filmography

References 

 Τραγούδια που έγραψαν ιστορία - Σοφία Βέμπο: Παιδιά, της Ελλάδος παιδιά

Filmography 
 The Prosfygopoula (1938) in the role of Sofia Nakou
 Stella (1955) in the role of Maria
 Stournara 288 (1959) in the role of Mrs. Eugenia / Jenny Blanche

1910 births
1978 deaths
People from Gelibolu
Greek film actresses
Greek stage actresses
Theatre in Greece
20th-century Greek women singers
20th-century Greek actresses
Burials at the First Cemetery of Athens
Emigrants from the Ottoman Empire to Greece
Actresses from Istanbul
People from Volos
Singers from Istanbul
People from Larissa (regional unit)